Longtan Dam is a large roller-compacted concrete (RCC) gravity dam on the Hongshui River in Tian'e County of the Guangxi Zhuang Autonomous Region, China, a tributary of the Xi River and the Pearl River.
The dam is intended for hydroelectric power production, flood control and navigation. The dam contains seven surface spillways, two bottom outlets and an underground power station. The Longtan ship lift, part of the dam complex, will be the tallest ship lift system in the world.

Construction
The dam was planned in the 1950s, but preliminary construction (roads, bridges, river diversion) did not begin until 1940s. Formal construction began on the project July 1, 2001, and the river was diverted by November 2003. Impounding of the  reservoir began in 2006, and the dam's first of three operational hydroelectric generating units was testing May 2007.

A pair of tunnels diverted the river around the site of the dam, during construction.

Navigation

The dam will submerge over 300 shoals, which had rendered the upper Hongshui unnavigable.   The Longtan ship lift will be able to lift vessels of up to 500 tonnes.  Chinese officials assert the dam and ship lift will turn the Hongshui into a "golden waterway" for reaching landlocked Guizhou and Guangxi provinces.

See also 

 List of power stations in China
 List of dams and reservoirs in China

References 

Buildings and structures in Guangxi
Hydroelectric power stations in Guangxi
Dams in China
Gravity dams
Dams completed in 2009
Roller-compacted concrete dams
Underground power stations
2009 establishments in China
Energy infrastructure completed in 2009
http://www.fao.org/nr/water/aquastat/countries_regions/Profile_segments/CHN-WR_eng.stm